Brain Thrust Mastery is the second studio album by We Are Scientists, which was released on March 17, 2008.

The first single from the album was "After Hours", which was selected as Jo Whiley's "Pet Sound" on BBC Radio 1 for the week beginning January 28, 2008, and then as Edith Bowman's "Top Rated" on February 11, 2008. Upon release, the album charted at #11 in the UK Albums Chart.

One of the songs of the album, "Let's See It" was also in an episode of Gossip Girl, Season 3, Episode 20.

Track listing
All songs written by Keith Murray & Chris Cain

B-Sides

References

External links
 Official website
 What's the Word

We Are Scientists albums
Virgin Records albums
2008 albums
Albums produced by Ariel Rechtshaid